The BC Oil and Gas Commission is a Crown Corporation of the province of British Columbia, Canada, established in 1998. Its mandate is to regulate oil and gas activities and pipelines in British Columbia. Their mandate does not extend to regulating consumer gas prices at the pump.

Overview
The Oil and Gas Commission (OGC) was created and defined under the 1998 Oil and Gas Commission Act by and for the Canadian province of British Columbia.
 
The OGC is a crown corporation acting as "an agent of the [provincial] government", where the Minister of Finance is its fiscal agent. It is headed by 3 directors.  The commission has approximately 270 employees in seven offices, as of 2019. The deputy minister is a director and the chair of the OGC, and the Lieutenant Governor in Council may appoint 2 directors, for a term not longer than 5 years, one of whom is the commissioner and vice chair of the commission.

Purpose
The OGCs purposes are to

(a) regulate oil and gas activities in British Columbia in a manner that
  "provides for the sound development of the oil and gas sector, by fostering a healthy environment, a sound economy and social well being,"
 "conserves petroleum and natural gas resources,"
 "ensures safe and efficient practices, and"
 "assists owners of petroleum and natural gas resources to participate equitably in the production of shared pools of petroleum and natural gas,"

(b)" to provide for effective and efficient processes for the review of applications for permits, and to ensure that applications that are approved are in the public interest having regard to environmental, economic, and social effects",

(c) "to encourage the participation of First Nations and aboriginal peoples in processes affecting them",

(d) "to participate in planning processes", and

(e) "to undertake programs of education and communication in order to advance safe and efficient practices and the other purposes of the commission."

Tools
The OGC issues various authorizations under the Oil and Gas Activities Act, including a "general development permit" which is "an approval in principle for oil and gas activities and pipelines in an area of British Columbia".

The OGC is a single window regulator It handles applications and also checks the compliance and enforces its regulations with penalties for violations.

The OGC has offices in seven cities: Fort St. John, Fort Nelson, Kelowna, Victoria, Terrace, Dawson Creek, and Prince George.

Compliance and enforcement information
In 2010–11, the OGC "issued 15 penalty tickets with fines of $575 (the maximum allowed for tickets) or less, which included unlawful water withdrawals and failure to promptly report a spill. Court prosecutions included a $20,000 fine for a Water Act stream violation, $10,575 for another stream violation and $250,0000 for a sour gas release. [...] The commission would not release the names of the companies convicted".
Per the OGC, in 2O12, of "more than 800 deficiencies, 80 resulted in charges, largely under the provincial Water Act for the non-reporting of water volumes and a smaller portion under the provincial Environment Management Act. Another 13 resulted in orders under the provincial Oil and Gas Activities Act, 22 in warnings, 76 in letters requiring action and three in referrals to other agencies".
Paul Jeakins, OGC commissioner and CEO, has publicly acknowledged that OGC inspection and enforcement reports are "a bit of a gap".

Lawsuits
In November 2013, Ecojustice, the Sierra Club and the Wilderness Committee filed a lawsuit against the OGC and Encana about Encana's water use from lakes and rivers for its hydraulic fracturing for shale gas, "granted by repeated short-term water permits, a violation of the provincial water act".  In 2012, the OGC had granted Encana access to 20.4 million cubic metres of surface water, 7 million of which were for fracking and 54% of that were through short-term approvals. In October 2014 the Supreme Court of British Columbia found no violation and dismissed the case.

Criticism
The agency has been criticized to be "too industry-friendly", to have "vague regulations" and to issue non transparent fracking violation reports.  However, the BC OGC does identify companies convicted of fracking violation on their website.

The B.C. Ministry of Environment and other B.C. Crown corporations of B.C. like WorkSafeBC have reported company names and details of those penalties for years. BC OGC reports have been available online since 2009.

See also
 History of the petroleum industry in Canada (frontier exploration and development)
 Greater Sierra (oil field) in B.C.
List of Canadian natural gas pipelines
List of Canadian oil pipelines
List of Canadian pipeline accidents
List of oil spills
List of largest oil and gas companies by revenue
Oil and gas law in the United States
Petroleum fiscal regime
Pipeline and Hazardous Materials Safety Administration- US counterpart regarding pipelines

References

External links
 Oil and Gas Commission - official site

Crown corporations of British Columbia
Petroleum organizations
Petroleum industry
Hydraulic fracturing
Regulators of Canada
Energy regulatory authorities